"Trickster" is the 18th single by Japanese singer and voice actress Nana Mizuki. The single contains the opening theme and ending theme for the anime Rosario + Vampire Capu2. This single holds the highest selling numbers for her first week sales and reached #100 in 2008 Oricon top 100 singles.

Track listing

Charts

References 

2008 singles
Nana Mizuki songs
Songs written by Nana Mizuki
2008 songs
King Records (Japan) singles